Daníel Þór Ingason (born 15 November 1995) is an Icelandic handball player for HBW Balingen-Weilstetten and the Icelandic national team.

He represented Iceland at the 2019 World Men's Handball Championship.

References

External links
EHF profile

1995 births
Living people
Daniel Thor Ingason
Valur men's handball players
Haukar men's handball players
Sportspeople from Reykjavík